Théodore (Théo) Hannon (1851-1916) was a Belgian painter, watercolorist, engraver, and man of letters. As a man of letters, he was a scenarist, theatrical-parodist, and poet.

As a poet he enjoyed the rare honor of being mentioned in glowing terms—along with French contemporaries Charles Baudelaire, Gustave Flaubert, Stéphane Mallarmé, Tristan Corbière, and Paul Verlaine—by Des Esseintes in Joris-Karl Huysmans' famous decadent novel, À rebours

Family 
Born October 1, 1851 at Ixelles, Belgium, and died April 7, 1916 at Etterbeek, Belgium, Théodore was the second of three siblings. His father,  (1822-1870), was a doctor of medicine and a professor of natural sciences (botany, zoology) at the Free University of Brussels. His brother, Édouard Hannon (1853-1931), was an engineer by profession and a pioneer of Belgian artistic photography. His sister,  (1850-1926), née Marie-Sophie Hannon, was a respected mycologist.

Biography 
Hammond first followed in the footsteps of his deceased father, by enrolling in a study of the sciences (1870-1871) and then medicine (1871-1873) at the Free University of Brussels. But before he graduated, he pivoted away from medicine toward the fine arts. He re-enrolled at the Académie royale des Beaux-Arts de Bruxelles (Royal Academy of Fine Arts in Brussels), and took Camille van Camp as his master. He became a member of the Société Libre des Beaux-Arts and then in 1875, together with several other artists including Alfred Verhaeren, Louis Artan, Félicien Rops and Périclès Pantazis, became a founding member of a new, anti-conformist group: . At this same time, he rejoined the International Society of Watercolorists, founded by Rops in 1869.

Literary career 
While he was working in the fine arts, Hannon also devoted himself to poetry. Writing under the pseudonym of "Red, Yellow, Black", he submitted some verse to the Students Journal (Journal des Etudiants),  launched October 22 1874, which was "totally impregnated with ideas from the University of Belgium." Approached by Victor Reding, the spokesman for a modernist group that had manifested itself at the center of a literary circle on rue de Namur, he became associated with the launch of a weekly literary magazine, The Artist, that had "youthful tendencies" and whose first number appeared November 28 1875. In August 1876, he published his first book, Les vingt-quatre coups de sonnet, a collection of poetry published by Félix Callewaert, who also printed The Artist. The book of poetry was embellished by an amusing frontispiece (mistakenly attributed to Rops). It was the work of a debutant, but worthy of notice because of its curious amalgam of realistic audacities and Parnassian exigencies. He fluctuated between being a painter and a poet, without concealing which of the two he preferred.

Despite his greater interest in the fine arts, literature would take a more important role in his activities and preoccupations. His relationship (mostly if not exclusively epistolary) with the French author Joris-Karl Huysmans seems to have contributed to this. In August, 1876 Huysmans, whose only known work at the time, Le Drageoir à épices (later changed to "aux épices"), had passed practically unnoticed, arrived in Brussels to supervise the publication of Martha, his second novel, which he didn't dare publish in his own country for fear of legal proceedings. He addressed himself to, and confided his manuscript into the hands of, Félix Callewaert. Martha was published by the Brussels publisher (under the name of Jean Gay) in Belgium on September 12, 1876, not too long after Hannon's first book of poetry, Les vingt-quatre coups de sonnet had appeared.

In the November 26, 1876 issue of The Artist, Hannon dedicated an article of high praise to Martha, which Huysmans thanked him for in a long letter dated December 16, 1876. It was the beginning of an exchange of letters that continued for several years, the tone of which was often marked by a similarity of taste. Huysmans later repaid the favor (of Hannon's positive review) publicly by writing the preface to a subsequent book of Hannon's poetry, Rhymes of Joy (Rimes de joie), but also—much more importantly—by including praise for the Belgian poet in the mouth of his character Des Esseintes, in Huysmans' seminal decadent novel À Rebours:

"[speaking of Tristan Corbière's] decadence... des Esseintes discovered it again in another poet, Théodore Hannon, a disciple of Baudelaire and Gautier, ripe in the special sense of studied elegances and factitious joys...."

Literary Works (in French) 
 Les vingt-quatre coups de sonnet, Félix Callewaert, Bruxelles, 1876
 Rimes de joie, éditions Henry Kistemaeckers, Bruxelles, 1881. 
 Au pays du Manneken-Pis, éditions Henry Kistemaeckers, Bruxelles, 1883. Illustration done by Amédée Ernest Lynen
 Le Candélabre (1883)
 La Valkyrigole (1887)
 Noëls fin-de-siècle (1892). Illustration done by Amédée Ernest Lynen
 Au clair de la dune, éditions Dorbon Ainé, Paris (1909) Online in French

Literary Works (Translated into English) 
 Drinkers of Phosphorous and Other Songs of Joy (originally Rimes de joie), Richard Robinson (Translator), J.-K. Huysmans (Preface), Snuggly Books, 2020.

Bibliography 
 Paul Delsemme (1999), « Théodore Hannon », in Nouvelle biographie nationale, Bruxelles, volume V, pp. 189–194.  online
 Paul Delsemme (2008), Théodore Hannon, poète moderniste, Bruxelles, Académie royale de langue et de littérature françaises de Belgique - online
 Joris-Karl Huysmans, Lettres à Théodore Hannon (1876-1886), edited, arranged and annotated by P. Cogny and Ch. Berg, Saint-Cyr-sur-Loire, Editions Christian Pirot, 1985.
 Jean-Jacques Symoens and Henri J. Dumont (2012), "Une famille belge de la Belle Epoque : les Hannon et les Rousseau, leur activité et leur héritage scientifique...", in Les Naturalistes belges, n°93, pp. 1–28 - online 
 Gustave Vanwelkenhuyzen (1934), « J.-K. Huysmans et Théodore Hannon », in Revue franco-belge, December 1934, pp. 565–584.

References 

1851 births
1916 deaths
People from Ixelles
Writers from Brussels
Artists from Brussels
Belgian poets in French
Free University of Brussels (1834–1969) alumni